Agüera may refer to:

Places
 Agüera (Belmonte), a civil parish in Belmonte de Miranda, Asturias, Spain
 Agüera del Coto, a civil parish in Cangas del Narcea, Asturias, Spain
 Asón-Agüera, comarca of Cantabria, Spain
 Lagouira or La Agüera, a town in Western Sahara
 Río Agüera, a river in northern Spain

People with the surname
 José Gutiérrez de Agüera, Spanish politician and Minister of State in 1898
 Ander Herrera Agüera (born 1989), Spanish footballer
 Salvador Gómez Agüera (born 1968), Spanish water polo player and Olympic gold medalist

See also
 Agüero (disambiguation)

Spanish-language surnames